Cwmavon Rugby Football Club also known as Cwmafan Rugby Football Club is a rugby union club based in Cwmavon, Wales. Cwmavon RFC is a member club of the Welsh Rugby Union, and is a feeder club for the Ospreys.

The club badge depicts a shield split in half vertically with the left side containing the Lamb of God rampant and the right side a red dragon rampant. A banner underneath bears the club name.

Cwmavon RFC has seen several past players selected to represent the Wales national team; although none of them did so while playing with the club having moved on to more senior teams.

Former players of note
 Emlyn Davies (2 caps)
 Oswald Griffiths
 Trevor Lloyd
 Walter Vickery (4 caps)
 Francis Picton (2 caps)

References

Welsh rugby union teams